The 1976 San Diego State Aztecs football team represented San Diego State University during the 1976 NCAA Division I football season as an independent. They had been a member of the Pacific Coast Athletic Association for the previous seven years.

The team was led by head coach Claude Gilbert, in his fourth year, and played home games at San Diego Stadium in San Diego, California. They finished the season with a record of ten wins and one loss (10–1).

Schedule

Team players in the NFL
The following were selected in the 1977 NFL Draft.

The following finished their college career in 1976, were not drafted, but played in the NFL.

Team awards

Notes

References

San Diego State
San Diego State Aztecs football seasons
San Diego State Aztecs football